John C. Calhoun was a longtime Pittsburgh Police leader, who served as Pittsburgh Police Chief from 1921 until 1923.

See also

 Police chief
 Allegheny County Sheriff's Office
 List of law enforcement agencies in Pennsylvania

References

Chiefs of the Pittsburgh Bureau of Police
Year of birth missing
Year of death missing